Prince Mikhail Mikhailovich Cantacuzène, Count Speransky (29 April 1875 – 25 March 1955) was a Russian general. The title of Count Speransky has been alternatively spelled "Spiransky" and "Speranski".

Biography

Family
Prince Michael (or Mikhail) was Prince Mikhail Mikhailovich Cantacuzène, eldest son of Prince Mikhail Rodionovich Cantacuzène and Elisabeth Sicard (French merchants in Odessa), was born on 29 April 1875 in Poltava, Ukraine, then part of Imperial Russia.  He was born at his family's estate which was known as Bouromka, in Poltava, the eldest of four children.  He had two younger brothers and a younger sister.  Prince Mikhail was the second great-grandson of Count Mikhail Speransky, the Russian statesman under Alexander I of Russia; the Prince's father had inherited the Speransky title, unusually and on basis of special remainder, from his own maternal grandmother, Elisabeth Bagréeff-Speransky, who was a daughter of the first Count Speransky.  The title of count was confirmed in 1872.  The Russian princely titles of the Cantacuzène were inherited via the Romanian line of Cantacuzène, with the service of Michael's great-grandfather Radu, Rodion Matveevich, Cantacuzène, who came from Romania to serve under Catherine the Great.  The princely titles were confirmed at that time (c. 1772) under the Russian tradition of military service granting transfer of foreign titles. In a matter of fact, they were not strictly princely in Romania, but were male line descendants from the Kantakouzenos emperors of Constantinople.

He was a member of the Cantacuzino family,  a Russian branch of which is an offshoot of the Moldavian branch.  The titles of Prince of Imperial Russia and of Count Speransky (Spiranky, Sperensky) were confirmed to Mikhail's grandfather Prince Rodion Nikolaevich Cantacuzène.  in 1865 by Alexander II; the title had formerly been held by Mikhail Speransky (1772–1839), Russian statesman and one-time adviser to Tsar Alexander I.  The father of Prince Rodion Nikolaiovich Cantacuzène, Prince Nikolai  Rodionovich Cantacuzène, became a Russian subject at an unknown date; in turn, his father, Prince Rodion Nikolaiovitch Cantacuzène, had emigrated from Moldava to Russia (Ukraine) and had died in Russia but not as a Russian citizen.

His mother's family were French Huguenots who also emigrated to the Russia of Catherine the Great; her family's wealth included the estate of Bouromka, several apartments in St. Petersburg, a villa in the Crimea, and an apartment in Paris.
His mother was exiled to Portuguese East Africa ( Mozambique) and was buried in Macequece( now called Vila de Manica)Mozambique died 20 April 1923 .

Early life and education
Prince Mikhail Cantacuzène had three siblings: Prince Boris (1876–1905), Princess Daria (1878–1944), and Prince Serge (1884-1953). Mikhail attended Page Corps in St. Petersburg, and later became a graduate of the Imperial Alexandrine Lycée. His military career formed the basis of his life before and after his diplomatic service, as he served in both the Russo-Japanese War of 1904-1905, and on the Polish front during the First World War.

Marriage
Prince Mikhail Mikhailovich Cantacuzène had a distant cousin, Prince Grigorii L'vovich Kantakuzen (1843–1902), who was also a diplomat, serving as Russian representative to the U.S. from 1892 to 1895.  But in 1893, Prince Mikhail was attached to the Russian embassy in Rome.  In that context, he met Julia Dent Grant, first born grandchild of US President Ulysses Simpson Grant, who was traveling in Europe with her maternal aunt, Bertha Palmer (née Honoré.) Aunt and niece travelled throughout Europe to promote interest in the World's Columbian Exposition as well as to collect art. The couple married in the home of her aunt Bertha Palmer in Newport, Rhode Island, on  22 September 1899.  Miss Grant assumed her husband's titles and was styled Julia Dent Cantacuzène Spiransky-Grant.

Prince and Princess Cantacuzène resided in St. Petersburg (later Petrograd) or at their estate in Ukraine during their early married years, with the Princess giving birth to their three children, Mikhail Mikhailovich, Barbara or "Bertha" Mikhailovna, and Zinaida Mikhailovna.  Princess Cantacuzène remained in St. Petersburg during World War I in which Prince Cantacuzène served as aide-de-camp and later Major-General, and finally General, in the service of Tsar Nicholas II.  He served with distinction and was wounded in battle in 1914; as commander of the South Russia Cossacks, in 1915 he led 15,000 men in what has been called the last great cavalry charge against a fortified position in military history.  The family left Russia in the aftermath of the Russian Revolution; in 1917, they escaped from Petrograd with her jewels sewn into her clothing and fled, via Finland, to the United States. The couple moved to Washington, D.C. and attempted to attract support for a counter-revolution in Russia, but after news of the assassination of the Tsar and of his brother, Grand Duke Michael Alexandrovich of Russia, ended their activism. The couple relocated to Sarasota, Florida, joining the firm founded by her aunt Bertha Palmer.

Prince Mikhail and Princess Julia Dent Grant Cantacuzène divorced on 27 October 1934, after which Mrs. Julia Grant Cantacuzène, having re-established her U.S. citizenship and reverting to non-aristocratic title and style, moved back to her native Washington, D.C.

Prince Cantacuzène remained in Sarasota, Florida.  His former wife's cousins (sons of Bertha Palmer), Honore and Potter Jr., had remained in Sarasota after their mother's death.  They expanded their agricultural and business enterprises, and brought (former Prince) Michael Cantacuzene into the Palmer corporate structure.  He managed the  Hyde Park citrus groves, helped organize the Palmer Bank when it opened in 1929, and became Vice President of the bank. He later married Jeannette Draper of Sarasota, who survived him.  After his death in 1955, local obituaries noted his extensive participation in community activities: American Legion, Elks, Kiwanis Club, County Fair Association, and Sarasota Chamber of Commerce.

Prince (Major General) Mikhail Cantacuzène - Speransky is buried at the Manasota Memorial Park in Sarasota - Bradenton (Manatee County).

Children
 HH Prince Mikhail Mikhailovich Cantacuzène, Count Speransky (b. 21 July 1900, St. Petersburg); married three times: firstly, to Clarissa Curtis, daughter of Thomas Pelham Curtis and Frances Kellogg Small; secondly, Florence Bushnell Carr; thirdly, Florence Clarke Hall.  He had one son and a daughter from his first marriage.
 HH Princess Barbara Mikhailovna Cantacuzène, Countess Speransky (b. 27 March 1904, St. Petersburg); married, firstly, Bruce Smith; one son: Bruce Michael Smith (17 February 1932 – 15 May 1982, Glen View, KY), survived by four children. She married, secondly, William Durrell Siebern.
 HH Princess Zinaida Mikhailovna Cantacuzène, Countess Speransky (b. 17 September 1908, St. Petersburg); married Sir John Coldbrook Hanbury-Williams, son of Major-General Sir John Hanbury-Williams and Annie Emily Reiss. They had one son and two daughters.

References

 Croft, Lee B., Ashleigh Albrecht, Emily Cluff, and Erica Resmer.  Entry (pp. 126–121) on Russian Ambassador to the U.S. from 1892 to 1895, Prince Grigorii L'vovich Kantakuzen (1843–1902)in AMBASSADORS: U.S.-to-Russia/Russia-to-U.S. Capstone Publications. 2010. . Treatment of genealogy of Cantacuzen/Kantakuzen princely line from Russian sources and from Julia Dent Grant's personal writings.

1875 births
1955 deaths
Russian princes
Military personnel from Odesa
White Russian emigrants to the United States
Royalty from Saint Petersburg
People from Sarasota, Florida
Mikhail
Grant family